Oudenburg is a city and municipality located in the Belgian province of West Flanders. The municipality comprises the city of Oudenburg itself and the towns of Ettelgem, Roksem and Westkerke. On January 1, 2006 Oudenburg had a total population of 8,929. The total area is 35.38 km² which gives a population density of 252 inhabitants per km².

There was a Roman Castellum on this location, built in the 4th century, whose outline is still visible in the city's streetplan. Some of the stones of the former walls were later used in the construction of the abbey. The former abbey of St. Peter at Oudenburg, founded by Arnold of Soissons, was destroyed during the French Revolution.

History
1070 AD: Arnold of Soissons founded the Abbey of St. Peter in Oudenburg.
1087: Death of Arnold of Soissons. (also known as Arnold of Oudenburg or Saint Arnold.)
1226: The City is represented on a Seal.
1843, February 2: The arms were granted.
The arms show a castle with the arms of the medieval Lords of Oudenburg in the gate. The castle (Burcht) is a canting element. The castle already appeared on the oldest seal of the city, dating from 1226. All later seals showed a castle, but the size and shape of the castle has changed considerably through the centuries. The small shield appeared for the first time in the 16th century.

Notable people
 John Cordier (b. Oudenburg, 1 September 1942), founder of Telindus.
 Charles Geleyns
 André Gennevoise (b. Lile France, 7 December 1856 Died 12 Juli 1936 at Oudenburg), owner of the abbey of St. Peter in Oudenburg.

References

External links

Official website  - Available only in Dutch
Google News Archives for Oudenburg

Municipalities of West Flanders